Ust-Pyzha (Pıjı-Oozı) is a rural locality (a selo) in Turochaksky District, the Altai Republic, Russia. The population was 158 as of 2016. There are 5 streets.

Geography 
Ust-Pyzha is located 54 km south of Turochak (the district's administrative centre) by road. Kebezen is the nearest rural locality.

References 

Rural localities in Turochaksky District